is a railway station in the town of Mamurogawa, Yamagata, Japan, operated by East Japan Railway Company (JR East).

Lines
Ōtaki Station is served by the Ōu Main Line, and is located 180.3 rail kilometers from the terminus of the line at Fukushima Station.

Station layout
The station has a single side platform serving one bi-directional track. The station is built in a gorge, with a two-story station building. The station faces the road on its upper floor, with the train platform connected to the station building on its lower floor. The station formerly also had an island platform, which has been removed, although the connecting footbridge remains. The station is unattended.

History
Ōtaki Station opened on September 20, 1941. The station was absorbed into the JR East network upon the privatization of JNR on April 1, 1987. A new station building was completed in March 2010.

Surrounding area
 Yamagata Prefectural Route 13

See also
List of railway stations in Japan

References

External links

 JR East Station information 

Stations of East Japan Railway Company
Railway stations in Yamagata Prefecture
Ōu Main Line
Railway stations in Japan opened in 1941
Mamurogawa, Yamagata